Giorgio Pellini (20 July 1923 – 14 June 1986) was an Italian fencer. He won three silver medals, one at the 1948 Summer Olympics and two more at the 1952 Summer Olympics.

References

1923 births
1986 deaths
Italian male fencers
Olympic fencers of Italy
Fencers at the 1948 Summer Olympics
Fencers at the 1952 Summer Olympics
Olympic silver medalists for Italy
Olympic medalists in fencing
Sportspeople from Livorno
Medalists at the 1948 Summer Olympics
Medalists at the 1952 Summer Olympics